At least 37 species of amphibians are native to Taiwan. Of these, 17 species are endemic to Taiwan. Salamander Echinotriton andersoni is considered extinct in Taiwan (but survives on the Ryukyu Islands of Japan). In addition, there are three introduced species: cane toad Rhinella marina, bullfrog Lithobates catesbeianus, and Chinese giant salamander Andrias davidianus. Thus, in total 40 amphibians have been recorded in Taiwan.

Anura (frogs and toads)

Family Bufonidae — true toads
 Bufo bankorensis Barbour, 1908  — endemic
 Duttaphrynus melanostictus (Schneider, 1799)
 Rhinella marina (Linnaeus, 1758)  — introduced
Family Dicroglossidae — fork-tongued frogs
 Fejervarya cancrivora (Gravenhorst, 1829)
 Fejervarya kawamurai Djong, Matsui, Kuramoto, Nishioka, and Sumida, 2011 — provisional
 Fejervarya multistriata (Hallowell, 1861)
 Fejervarya sakishimensis Matsui, Toda, and Ota, 2008
 Hoplobatrachus rugulosus (Wiegmann, 1834)
 Limnonectes fujianensis (Ye and Fei, 1994)
Family Hylidae — (Ameroaustralian) treefrogs
 Hyla chinensis Günther, 1858
Family Microhylidae — narrow-mouthed frogs/toads
 Kaloula pulchra Gray, 1831
 Microhyla butleri Boulenger, 1900
 Microhyla fissipes Boulenger, 1884
 Microhyla heymonsi Vogt, 1911
 Micryletta steinegeri (Boulenger, 1909)  — endemic
Family Ranidae — true frogs

 Babina adenopleura (Boulenger, 1909)
 Babina okinavana (Boettger, 1895)
 Hylarana latouchii (Boulenger, 1899)
 Hylarana taipehensis (Van Denburgh, 1909)
 Lithobates catesbeianus (Shaw, 1802)  — introduced
 Odorrana swinhoana (Boulenger, 1903)  — endemic
 Pelophylax fukienensis (Pope, 1929)
 Rana longicrus Stejneger, 1898
 Rana sauteri Boulenger, 1909  — endemic
 Sylvirana guentheri (Boulenger, 1882)
Family Rhacophoridae  — flying frogs or Afro-Asian treefrogs
Subfamily Buergeriinae
 Buergeria japonica (Hallowell, 1861)
 Buergeria otai Wang, Hsiao, Lee, Tseng, Lin, Komaki, and Lin, 2017 — endemic
 Buergeria robusta (Boulenger, 1909)  — endemic
Subfamily Rhacophorinae
 Kurixalus berylliniris (Wu, Huang, Tsai, Li, Jhang, and Wu, 2016)  — endemic
 Kurixalus eiffingeri (Boettger, 1895)
 Kurixalus idiootocus (Kuramoto and Wang, 1987)  — endemic
 Kurixalus wangi (Wu, Huang, Tsai, Li, Jhang, and Wu, 2016)  — endemic
 Polypedates braueri (Vogt, 1911)
 Polypedates megacephalus (Hallowell, 1861)  — introduced
 Rhacophorus arvalis Lue, Lai, and Chen, 1995  — endemic
 Rhacophorus aurantiventris Lue, Lai, and Chen, 1994  — endemic
 Rhacophorus moltrechti Boulenger, 1908  — endemic
 Rhacophorus prasinatus Mou, Risch, and Lue, 1983  — endemic
 Rhacophorus taipeianus Liang and Wang, 1978  — endemic

Caudata (salamanders)

Family Cryptobranchidae — giant salamanders
 Andrias davidianus (Blanchard, 1871)   — introduced (likely)
Family Hynobiidae — Asian salamanders
 Hynobius arisanensis Maki, 1922  — endemic
 Hynobius formosanus Maki, 1922  — endemic
 Hynobius fucus Lai and Lue, 2008  — endemic
 Hynobius glacialis Lai and Lue, 2008  — endemic
 Hynobius sonani (Maki, 1922)  — endemic
Family Salamandridae — newts
 Echinotriton andersoni (Boulenger, 1892) — extinct in Taiwan

References

Amphibians
 
Taiwan
China